Níspero, nipero, nêspera and mespel are terms referring to certain fruit-bearing trees, or to their fruit in particular:

 Common medlar (Mespilus germanica), the origin of the term (called Mispel in many Germanic languages, mispeli in Finnish, nespolo in Italian, etc.)
 Loquat (Eriobotrya japonica), widely traded under these names today, in particular in temperate countries
 Sapodilla (Manilkara zapota), often known by these terms in tropical countries in Latin America
 Manilkara huberi a tropical fruit